Malcolm Bell Wiseman (May 23, 1925 – February 24, 2019) was an American bluegrass and country singer.

Early life
He was born on May 23, 1925, in Crimora, Virginia. He attended school in New Hope, Virginia, and graduated from high school there in 1943. He had polio from the age of six months; due to his disabilities, he could not do field work and spent his time in childhood listening to old records.  He studied at the Shenandoah Conservatory in Dayton, Virginia, before it moved to Winchester, Virginia, in 1960 and started his career as a disc jockey at WSVA-AM in Harrisonburg, Virginia.

Music career
His musical career began as upright bass player in the Cumberland Mountain Folks, the band of country singer Molly O'Day.  When Lester Flatt and Earl Scruggs left Bill Monroe's band, Wiseman became the guitarist for their new band, the Foggy Mountain Boys. Later he played with Bill Monroe's Bluegrass Boys.

In 1951, his first solo single, "'Tis Sweet to Be Remembered", was released. According to Rolling Stone this song "catapulted him to solo stardom".

He was co-founder of the Country Music Association (CMA) and was its last living co-founder. In 1958, the original CMA board was formed with help from Wiseman to save the popularity of country music from rock & roll. He also served as the first secretary of CMA. From 1966 to 1970, Wiseman served as director of the WWVA Jamboree.

In 1986 he co-founded the International Bluegrass Music Association (IBMA) which was another influential bluegrass music body.

Wiseman was referred to by a disc jockey as "The Voice with a Heart", a title which became popular among his fans. He was popular for his interpretations of songs on Dot Records such as "Shackles and Chains", "I'll Be All Smiles Tonight", "Jimmy Brown the Newsboy", and "Love Letters in the Sand".

In 2014, he released an album of songs inspired by his mother's handwritten notebooks of songs she heard on the radio when Wiseman was a child: Songs From My Mother's Hand.

He died in Nashville on February 24, 2019. The cause of death was kidney failure.

Awards and honors
In 1993 he was inducted into the International Bluegrass Music Hall of Honor. Wiseman was a recipient of a 2008 National Heritage Fellowship awarded by the National Endowment for the Arts, which is the United States' highest honor in the folk and traditional arts. In 2014 he became part of the Veteran Era category of the Country Music Hall of Fame, as "an artist who achieved national prominence more than 45 years ago".

Selected discography

Albums

Notable singles

References

External links
 [ Mac Wiseman Biography]
 Mac Wiseman Interview NAMM Oral History Library (2004)
 
 

1925 births
2019 deaths
Bluegrass musicians from Virginia
American country singer-songwriters
People from Augusta County, Virginia
Dot Records artists
Singer-songwriters from Virginia
National Heritage Fellowship winners
Country Music Hall of Fame inductees
Foggy Mountain Boys members